Xinsha station, is a station and the current eastern terminus of Line 13 of the Guangzhou Metro, and is also the easternmost station in the entire system. It started operations on 28 December 2017.

Station layout

Exits

References

Railway stations in China opened in 2017
Guangzhou Metro stations in Zengcheng District